Bruno Polius (born 8 May 1958) or Bruno Polius-Victoire is a French singer. In the 1970s he was the lead singer/soloist of the boyband Les Poppys.

Although the lineup of Les Poppys changed several times, Bruno was the lead singer on the band's largest hit "Non-Non Rien n'a changé".

Bruno also recorded several records as solo artist, mainly during the same years as his membership of Les Poppys (see below).

Records (selection)
As a solo artist he recorded the following singles

 Rosanna
 Hey l'Homme (1973)
 Au Revoir Mama / Il faut que tu reviennes (1974)
 Un Martiniquais, une Polonaise *1976)

Record selection Les Poppys
As main singer of the boyband Les Poppys, Bruno recorded the following singles
Noël 70 (1970)
Love, lioubov, amour (1970)
Non, je ne veux pas faire la guerre... (1970)
Isabelle, je t'aime (1970)
Non, non, rien n'a changé (1971)
Non, ne criez pas... (1971)
Des chansons pop (1971)
L'Enfant do (1972)
Liberté (1972)
Il faut une fleur pour faire le monde (1976)
Visite (1980), with Lenny Kuhr

References

French male singers
French pop singers
French child singers
French people of Martiniquais descent
Living people
1958 births
Place of birth missing (living people)